Methylene diurea (MDU) is the organic compound with the formula CH2(NHC(O)NH2)2.  It is a white water-soluble solid.  The compound is formed by the condensation of formaldehyde with urea.  Methylene diurea is the substrate for the enzyme methylenediurea deaminase.

Applications
MDU is an intermediate in the production of urea-formaldehyde resins.

Together with dimethylene triurea, MDU is a component of some controlled-release fertilizers.

References

Fertilizers
Horticulture
Ureas